Savina may refer to

Places
Savina, Ljubno, a dispersed settlement in Slovenia
Savina Ski Jumping Center in Slovenia
Savina monastery (Serbia), cave monastery in southern Serbia
Savina monastery (Montenegro)
La Savina, a port village in eastern Spain
Savina Museum in South Korea

Other
Savina (name)
Savina Caylyn, an oil tanker of the Italian shipping line Fratelli D'Amato
Red Savina pepper, a chile pepper